Josip Bašić (born 2 March 1996) is a Croatian professional footballer who plays as a right back or right winger, as of July 2020 a free agent after playing for Hajduk Split in the Prva HNL.

Club career
Bašić joined Hajduk Split's youth academy in 2010, aged 13, after stints at Primorac Stobreč and Omladinac Vranjic. A regular Croatian youth international he established himself as the right wing of choice for the under-17 team at the beginning of the 2011–12 season, aged only 15, even playing some games for the under-19 team, both as a winger and a right back, towards the end of the season. He was called up to the first team for the game against Dinamo Zagreb on 29 September 2012, starting on the bench, but making his debut by entering for Marko Bencun in the 57th minute, thus becoming the youngest debutant in league history.

Bašić scored his first goal for Hajduk's senior team in the national league in November 2013, against Slaven Belupo.

Throughout his tenure at the club, Bašić was plagued by a string of injuries, which ultimately resulted in Hajduk releasing Bašić after his contract expired on June 30, 2020.

References

External links
Josip Bašić at hajduk.hr

1996 births
Living people
Footballers from Split, Croatia
Croatian footballers
Croatia youth international footballers
HNK Hajduk Split players
Croatian Football League players
Association football wingers